Mr Bowling Buys a Newspaper  is a psychological thriller by Donald Henderson; it was the first novel Henderson published under his own name, and was first published in 1943.

Plot summary
Mr Bowling is a serial killer, and often buys newspapers after a murder in order to see if the death has been reported. He kills, however, not for mere pleasure, but because he hates living, wishes to be caught, and to be hanged. Nevertheless, after his last killing, he meets Alice, the love of his life whom he has always wanted to meet, who saves him with a false alibi. Alice, who is the daughter of a vicar and is religiously devout herself, rescues Bowling with forgiveness.

Publication and reception
From early youth Henderson had written novels and plays under various pseudonyms but it was with Mr Bowling Buys a Newspaper that he first published under his own name. The novel received considerable critical attention in wartime Britain, but received mixed reactions. Raymond Chandler described it as his favourite novel. By contrast, one member of the public wrote to Henderson's publishers, Constable & Co, and described it as 'the last word in filth'.

Although adapted a number of times, after Henderson's early death in 1947, it eventually became forgotten, as did his other works. Although the film rights were sold, no film was ever made. For many years out of print, Mr Bowling Buys a Newspaper was republished by Collins Crime Club in 2019, with an introduction by Martin Edwards.

Adaptations
In 1946, it was dramatised for the stage under the same title with a cast headed by Anthony Hawtery and Jean Forbes-Robertson and had a short run at the Embassy Theatre in London: the play was set in just one of the locations from the novel, as 'a bloody boarding-house slaughter'.
In 1948, film actor Gene Raymond obtained the screen rights to it, according to the New York Daily News. 
In 1950, Anthony Hawtrey (as Mr Bowling) and Vida Hope (as Alice) starred in teleplay of the novel on British television. 
A TV movie was made in 1957, produced and directed by Stephen Harrison, and featuring Hugh Sinclair as Mr Bowling and Beryl Reid as Alice.

References 

1943 British novels
Constable & Co. books